798 Ruth is a minor planet orbiting the Sun that was discovered by the German astronomer Max Wolf on 21 November 1914. It may have been named after the biblical character Ruth. The orbital plane is tilted by 9.2° from the plane of the ecliptic.

This is a member of the dynamic Eos family of asteroids that most likely formed as the result of a collisional breakup of a parent body. It is an M-type (metallic) asteroid that displays a significant component of the mineral olivine in its spectrum. 798 Ruth spans  and rotates on its axis once every .

References

External links 
 
 

000798
Discoveries by Max Wolf
Named minor planets
000798
19141121